KZJO (channel 22), branded as Fox 13+, is a television station in Seattle, Washington, United States, broadcasting the MyNetworkTV programming service. It is owned and operated by Fox Television Stations alongside Tacoma-licensed Fox outlet KCPQ (channel 13). Both stations share studios on Westlake Avenue in Seattle's Westlake neighborhood, while KZJO's transmitter is located near the Capitol Hill section of Seattle.

The station operates two UHF translators, and KZJO rebroadcasts KCPQ's programming on its second digital subchannel in high definition to provide that station to areas in the eastern portion of the Seattle market that receive weak signal coverage from KCPQ's Bremerton transmitter.

History
The station began broadcasting as KTZZ-TV on June 22, 1985, owned by Alden Television, Inc. The call letters stood for "Television 22", the "Z"s closely resembling numeral "2"s. At the time the station signed on, it was the first new TV station to sign on in the Seattle area since KIRO-TV went on the air in 1958, and there was a hole in the Seattle market for cartoons and sitcoms. While KSTW (channel 11) was running such programming, KCPQ counter-programmed with more adult fare like dramas, game shows, and movies. As such, KTZZ signed on with a lineup of classic off-network sitcoms, westerns, cartoons, movies, and dramas. Originally, to keep people from changing channels, the station broadcast only its station identification—no commercials—between the closing credits of one show and the opening credits of the next show. One Christmas season, as snow fell in the Puget Sound area, viewers were treated to a gag in which someone pretending to be a janitor (Rob Thielke) takes control of the station for a few moments to deliver "the news" which was mostly a fake weather forecast which began "The weather outside is frightful. But inside it's quite delightful. As long as I've got no place to go, let it snow, let it snow, let it snow."

KTZZ began with a very promising start, airing fairly strong syndicated shows, and was initially profitable under Alden ownership. However, in 1989, the station was sold to Dudley Broadcasting. By that time, KCPQ and KSTW had strong lineups, including much of the children's programming available, but KTZZ was losing ground and unable to acquire strong off-network syndicated shows. With KCPQ now in the kids business, the best cartoons were now airing on KSTW and KCPQ, leaving KTZZ with leftovers (which still was about five hours worth of cartoons a day). KTZZ was also the home, for several years, of the eclectic Seattle talk show The Spud Goodman Show. Producing the weekly interview/music/feature show was an ambitious undertaking for a small station, and the program relied heavily on a large staff of volunteers. The programming costs became too high for KTZZ. As a result, KTZZ began airing CBS shows preempted by KIRO-TV (channel 7), along with paid programming and brokered shows. It still ran some conventional syndicated products, but they were essentially programs that no other stations in the market wanted.

On January 11, 1995, KTZZ affiliated with the newly-formed WB Television Network. The WB had initially signed KSTW in 1993 as its Seattle affiliate; however, that station's owner, Gaylord Broadcasting, backed out of the deal a year later to affiliate with CBS, only to become a UPN-owned station in 1997. KTZZ picked up syndicated cartoons formerly on KSTW in 1995, added more off-network sitcoms and moved away from the brokered show format. As it began airing programming from The WB, KTZZ was helped in part by the fact that KCPQ was moving towards news and more first-run syndicated talk, courtroom, and drama shows.

Dudley Communications sold KTZZ, along with sister station WXMI in Grand Rapids, Michigan, to Emmis Communications in 1998; the two stations were then promptly dealt to Tribune Broadcasting in exchange for WQCD in New York City. Tribune changed the station's call letters to KTWB-TV (The Warner Brothers Network) on April 26, 1999. After Tribune acquired KCPQ in early 1999, KTWB's license was transferred to a trustee in the short-term until the FCC's approval of television duopolies later that year, though Tribune managed and operated the station during this period via a local marketing agreement. In 2004, KTWB revised its on-air brand from WB 22 to Seattle's WB as part of a groupwide branding effort.

MyNetworkTV affiliation

On January 24, 2006, Time Warner announced that the company would merge the operations of The WB with CBS Corporation's UPN (which CBS acquired one month earlier in December 2005 following its split from Viacom), to form a joint venture called The CW Television Network. The network signed a ten-year affiliation agreement with Tribune Broadcasting for 13 of the 16 WB affiliates that the company owned at the time. KTWB was one of the three Tribune stations passed over for an affiliation as CBS-owned UPN affiliate KSTW (which was included in 11 of 14 CBS-owned UPN affiliates) was chosen as The CW's Seattle-Tacoma charter station. KTWB was slated to revert to an independent station, but on May 15, 2006, Tribune announced that it would affiliate channel 22 (and two other WB affiliates that were not included in the CW affiliation deal) with MyNetworkTV, a competing network created by News Corporation that is run by the company's Fox Television Stations and Twentieth Television units.

On July 14, 2006, channel 22's call letters were officially changed to KMYQ to reflect its new affiliation, and the station's brand name was changed to myQ² (alluding to its parent station, KCPQ, which brands as Q13 Fox) on August 7, 2006. On March 31, 2008, KMYQ became just the second MyNetworkTV affiliate in the Pacific Time Zone to utilize an early prime time schedule from 7 to 9 p.m. (the first was KQCA/Sacramento, which has since moved MyNetworkTV programming back to its recommended 8–10 p.m. timeslot). By 2009, MyNetworkTV converted from a full-fledged network to a programming service.

On September 13, 2010, the station moved its MyNetworkTV programming to 11 pm. KMYQ changed its call letters to KZJO and as part of a company-wide branding effort during the era Tribune was owned by Sam Zell to play down network affiliations, unconventionally rebranded as JOEtv that same day, casting the station in its branding as a neighborhood dive bar carrying 'blue collar' programming. This included its website template changing to one titled "Joe's Wall", designed to look like a 'bar bathroom', with appropriate graffiti on its virtual stalls advertising the station's offerings. The branding was soon toned down as it cast the station to viewers as an unpopular 'down-market' operation, and after the last of the Zell group departed Tribune Media, the station took on a more traditional brand image, though the logo remained relatively unchanged (with the 'graffiti drips' removed) until the station came under Fox control in 2021.

On September 19, 2011, the station moved MyNetworkTV programming yet again, this time, back one hour to 12 a.m. As of 2020, it airs even later, from 1 a.m. to 3 a.m. and is rarely promoted on air, if at all. The station's later websites under Tribune would not mention the station's network affiliation, and for several years, the site's 'about us' copy erroneously said it ended the affiliation in 2011.

Aborted sale to Sinclair Broadcast Group

On May 8, 2017, Sinclair Broadcast Group—which has owned ABC affiliate KOMO-TV (channel 4) and Univision affiliate KUNS-TV (channel 51) since its 2013 merger with Seattle-based Fisher Communications—entered into an agreement to acquire Tribune Media for $3.9 billion, plus the assumption of $2.7 billion in debt held by Tribune. Sinclair was precluded from acquiring KCPQ directly, as both it and KOMO-TV rank among the four highest-rated stations in the Seattle−Tacoma market in total day viewership and broadcasters are not allowed to legally own more than two full-power television stations in a single market. It was later announced that Sinclair would initially keep KOMO/KUNS and sell KCPQ/KZJO to a third party to be determined later, leaving most analysts to believe that Fox Television Stations would acquire KCPQ/KZJO, making KZJO a MyNetworkTV owned-and-operated station. On April 24, 2018, Sinclair changed its plans for KZJO and decided instead to acquire the station and form a new duopoly with KOMO; the arrangement would also result in Sinclair selling KUNS to partner company Howard Stirk Holdings, with Sinclair retaining control of the latter through joint sales and shared services agreements, which would form a virtual triopoly in the Seattle market. On May 9, 2018, Fox Television Stations announced that it would buy KCPQ as part of a $910-million deal that also involved six other Tribune-owned stations (Fox affiliates KTXL in Sacramento, KSWB-TV in San Diego, KDVR in Denver, WJW in Cleveland and KSTU in Salt Lake City, and CW affiliate WSFL-TV in Miami).

On July 18, 2018, the FCC voted to have the Sinclair–Tribune acquisition reviewed by an administrative law judge amid "serious concerns" about Sinclair's forthrightness in its applications to sell certain conflict properties. Three weeks later on August 9, Tribune announced it would terminate the Sinclair deal, intending to seek other M&A opportunities. Tribune also filed a breach of contract lawsuit in the Delaware Chancery Court, alleging that Sinclair engaged in protracted negotiations with the FCC and the U.S. Department of Justice's Antitrust Division over regulatory issues, refused to sell stations in markets where it already had properties, and proposed divestitures to parties with ties to Sinclair executive chair David D. Smith that were rejected or highly subject to rejection to maintain control over stations it was required to sell.

Sale to Nexstar and resale to Fox
On December 3, 2018, Irving, Texas-based Nexstar Media Group announced it would acquire the assets of Tribune Media for $6.4 billion in cash and debt. The deal—which made Nexstar the largest television station operator by total number of stations—resulted in KCPQ and KZJO becoming Nexstar's first television station properties located within Washington State. (The group's closest station to Seattle is CBS affiliate KOIN in Portland, Oregon, whose associated media market includes portions of southwestern Washington, including the Portland suburb of Vancouver.) However, reports preceding the purchase announcement stated that, as it did during the group's failed purchase by Sinclair, Fox Television Stations may seek to acquire certain Fox-affiliated stations owned by Tribune—with KCPQ potentially being a candidate for resale—from the eventual buyer of that group.

Following the merger's completion on September 19, 2019, Nexstar announced that KCPQ and KZJO would be acquired by Fox Television Stations in a $350 million deal that also includes WITI in Milwaukee, Wisconsin, and is concurrent with Nexstar's purchase of WJZY and WMYT-TV in Charlotte, North Carolina from Fox. The most immediate effect of the sale for KZJO would be a return to a more traditional branding (likely Fox's current "Plus" branding scheme for its MyNetworkTV stations, returning KZJO to the complementary branding it had with KCPQ from 2006 until 2010). Fox has drawn its MyNetworkTV stations away from default prime time scheduling for the block, and has continued to support KCPQ's Tribune-era strategy of prime time newscasts on KZJO, and late night scheduling for MyNetworkTV. The sale was completed on March 2, 2020, making the duopoly two of three network-owned stations in the market, alongside KSTW.

In September 2021, Fox Television Stations submitted updated logos for KCPQ and KZJO to their FCC public file sites, with the latter shown to be rebranded as "Fox 13+", which went into effect on September 24.

Programming

Sports programming
KMYQ/KZJO aired Monday Night Football games featuring the Seattle Seahawks from 2006 (following MNFs move from ABC to ESPN) to 2012, when Belo outbid Tribune for rights to MNF and NFL Network's Thursday Night Football Seahawks games and placed them on KONG.

In 2014, the station began to air Major League Soccer matches featuring Seattle Sounders FC alongside KCPQ. The station also aired pre-match and post-match coverage for the team through the end of the 2022 season.

Newscasts

On September 16, 1991, KTZZ-TV launched a 10 p.m. newscast produced by KIRO-TV. The newscast was joined on April 19, 1993 by a simulcast of the 5–7 a.m. portion of KIRO-AM-FM's morning show. Both programs were dropped later that year. On March 31, 2008, KMYQ began airing a KCPQ-produced 9 p.m. newscast (Q13 Fox News @ Nine on myQ², now Fox 13 News at 8:00/9:00) Monday through Sunday.

Technical information

Subchannels
The station's digital signal is multiplexed:

Analog-to-digital conversion
KZJO (as KMYQ) shut down its analog signal, over UHF channel 22, on June 12, 2009, as part of the mandatory federally mandated transition from analog to digital television. The station's digital signal remained on its pre-transition UHF channel 25, using PSIP to display KZJO's virtual channel as 22 on digital television receivers.

Translators

References

External links
KCPQ website 
Antenna TV Seattle website

ZJO
Fox Television Stations
MyNetworkTV affiliates
Antenna TV affiliates
Television channels and stations established in 1985
1985 establishments in Washington (state)
Major League Soccer over-the-air television broadcasters